The Burren Action Group are a group of people from County Clare in Ireland who opposed plans by the Office of Public Works during the 1990s to develop a large scale interpretative centre at Mullaghmore in the local Burren area.

Goal
The Group was a collective of concerned locals who fought to maintain the natural integrity of the landscape and to protect the environment from elements of the Government of Ireland which did not understand what was at stake. They also felt that the Burren and the area of Mullaghmore is a "sacred site"  and holy ground that needed to be defended in a country whose sites of profound historical importance are rapidly disappearing.

History
In 1992/1993 seven members of the group lodged a complaint against the project with the Irish High Court, which resulted in work being stopped. These seven included local farmers like James Howard and Patrick McCormack, priest Fr. John O’Donohue, Prof. Emer Colleran as well as media figures like the producer P.J. Curtis or Lelia Doolan. The Burren Action  Group was also supported by leftist politicians like Brigid Makowski.

Following about ten years of opposition, the group was finally successful in March 2000. An Bord Pleanála confirmed the ruling by the Clare County Council to refuse planning permission for a scaled-down version of the original plans.

In 2012, James Howard and Patrick McCormack, the latter owner of the house that featured as the parochial house in the Father Ted TV show, once again opposed a new application to construct a car park at the site of the planned visitors' centre.

Fundraising
The Burren Action Group compiled a music album in the early 1990s, entitled Music in the Stone to raise money to save Mullaghmore because "...the wheels of greed are rolling towards it".

References

External links
 Burren Action Group website

Environmental organisations based in Ireland